The Little Cedar River is a  tributary of the Cedar River in Dodge County, Minnesota.

See also
List of rivers of Minnesota

References

Rivers of Minnesota
Rivers of Dodge County, Minnesota